The 11th Battalion, CEF, an infantry battalion of the Canadian Expeditionary Force, was authorized on 10 August 1914 and embarked for Great Britain on 30 September 1914. It was redesignated as the 11th Reserve Infantry Battalion , CEF, on 29 April 1915, to provide reinforcements to the Canadian Corps in the field. On 4 January 1917, its personnel, along with the personnel of the 100th Battalion (Winnipeg Grenadiers), CEF, were absorbed by a new 11th Reserve Battalion (Manitoba), CEF. The battalion was disbanded on 12 October 1917.

The battalion recruited in Prince Albert, Moose Jaw, Regina and Saskatoon, Saskatchewan and Winnipeg, Manitoba and mobilized at Camp Valcartier, Quebec.

The 11th Reserve Battalion formed part of the Canadian Training Depot at Tidworth Camp on the Salisbury Plain.

The 11th Battalion, CEF, had three Officers Commanding:
Lt. Col. R. Burritt, 22 September 1914 – 23 August 1915
Lt. Col. A. Dulmage, 23 August 1915 – 15 September 1915
Lt. Col. A.E. Carpenter, 26 November 1915 – 27 April 1916
Lt. Col. P. Walker, 8 May 1916 – 4 January 1917

Perpetuations 
The 11th Battalion, CEF, is perpetuated by The Winnipeg Grenadiers, currently on the Supplementary Order of Battle.

Battle Honours 
The battalion was awarded the following battle honours:

 Ypres 1915, '17
 Festubert, 1915
 Mount Sorrel
 Ancre Heights
 Ancre, 1916
 Arras, 1917, '18
 Vimy, 1917
 Hill 70
 Passchendaele
 Amiens
 Scarpe, 1918
 Drocourt-Quéant
 Hindenburg Line
 Canal du Nord
 Valenciennes
 Sambre
 France and Flanders, 1915-18
 The Great War 1914-17

See also 

 List of infantry battalions in the Canadian Expeditionary Force

References 

Military units and formations of Manitoba
011
Winnipeg Grenadiers